Heinrich Gomperz (January 18, 1873 in Vienna, Austria-Hungary – December 27, 1942 in Los Angeles, California) was an Austrian philosopher.

He was a son of Theodor Gomperz. He was a patient of Sigmund Freud and was married to Ada Stepnitz.

Works 

 , 1898.
 , 1907.
 Die indische Theosophie, 1925.
 , 2 Vols., 1905–1908.
 , 1915.
 Über Sinn und Sinngebilde, Erklären und Verstehen, 1929.
 , 1953.

External links
 Short biography in the Österreich-Lexikon. (German, English)
  (German)
 Collected correspondence of Austrian scholars Theodor Gomperz and his son Heinrich

1873 births
1942 deaths
Writers from Vienna
Austrian Jews
Austrian philosophers
Austro-Hungarian emigrants to the United States
American philosophers
Jewish philosophers